The New Ireland myzomela (Myzomela pulchella), also known as crimson-fronted myzomela or olive-yellow myzomela, is a species of bird in the family Meliphagidae.
It is endemic to Papua New Guinea.

Its natural habitats are subtropical or tropical moist lowland forests and subtropical or tropical moist montane forests.

References

New Ireland myzomela
Birds of New Ireland Province
New Ireland myzomela
New Ireland myzomela
Taxonomy articles created by Polbot